Nils Terje Dalseide  (29 August 1952 – 10 June 2018) was a Norwegian judge and civil servant. He was born in Ål.

He served as State Conciliator of Norway from 2013 until his death in 2018.

References

1952 births
2018 deaths 
People from Ål
Norwegian judges 
Norwegian civil servants